Miss Helyett is a 1933 French comedy film directed by Hubert Bourlon and Jean Kemm and starring Josette Day, Jim Gérald and Roger Bourdin. It is based on Miss Helyett an 1891 opérette by Edmond Audran and Maxime Boucheron.

The film's sets were designed by Jean d'Eaubonne.

Cast
 Josette Day as Miss Helyett  
 Jim Gérald as Le professeur Smithson  
 Roger Bourdin as Paul Landrin  
 Germaine Reuver as La señora  
 Fred Pasquali as Puycardas  
 Turgot as Un ami  
 Renée Devilder as Norette  
 Simone Mareuil as Lolotte 
 Janette Julia as Toto  
 Dan Etche as Alonza  
 Anne-Marie Leducq as Lisette  
 Anita Palacine as Jeannette  
 Robert Lepers as James 
 Robert Pizani as Bacarel 
 Renée Piat

References

Bibliography 
 Goble, Alan. The Complete Index to Literary Sources in Film. Walter de Gruyter, 1999.

External links 
 

1933 films
1933 comedy films
French comedy films
1930s French-language films
Films directed by Hubert Bourlon
Films directed by Jean Kemm
French black-and-white films
1930s French films